Llegaré is the debut studio album by Latin actress and recording artist Stephanie Cayo. It was released in Colombia on 25 June 2011. Production for the album came primarily from José Gaviria, alongside Stephanie Cayo.

Track listing

International version

Personnel 
Stephanie Cayo - Composer, Performer, Lyricist, Producer, Primary Artist, Vocals (Background)
Ray Staff - Mastering
Andres Munera - Composer, Keyboard Programming, Sample Programming
José Gaviria - Producer, Composer, Guitar, Vocals (Background) 
Simon Brand - Photography
Diego Cadavid - Photography

References

2011 debut albums
Stephanie Cayo albums